The eROCKIT is a light electric motorcycle that is operated like a bicycle. It is the first pedal controlled electric motorcycle, called Human Hybrid. In contrast to a pedelec, there is no direct mechanical energy transfer from the pedals to the rear wheel. The vehicle is developed and produced by eROCKIT Systems GmbH in Germany under the direction of the managing director Andreas Zurwehme. The design of the eROCKIT is done from Konstantinos Heyer.

History 
First prototypes were created in the alternative Berlin bicycle scene. eROCKIT Systems GmbH has acquired the brand and all rights to the vehicle and develops and produces the eROCKIT with a team of international two-wheeler experts in production halls in the town of Hennigsdorf near Berlin. Production is supported by the State of Brandenburg.

"We have set ourselves the goal of building the most interesting and the best electric motorcycle of the future," explains Andreas Zurwehme, the managing director of the eROCKIT Systems GmbH in an interview. Richard Gaul, former head of communications at BMW, advises the company.

Technical details 
To move the eROCKIT, you have to pedal, as there is no throttle installed. The speed of the vehicle is exclusively controlled by the pedals. A drive belt transmits the pedal rotation to a small generator that both feeds electricity into the system and triggers current for the motor controller.

The rear wheel is powered by an electric motor, connected through an additional drive belt, which is also used as a brake recuperation system to return braking energy to the batteries. In addition to the recuperation system, the eROCKIT is equipped with a front and a rear disc brake.

The range of the battery charge is 120 km depending on user behavior. The vehicle has 3 selectable driving modes (Eco / Normal / Sport) that limits the power output and helps to save energy. The charging of the batteries takes place at a normal 110-230 V socket. Since the vehicle is licensed as a light motorcycle (vehicle class L3e) for road traffic, a driving license of European class A1 is required.

See also

Overengineering -  act of designing a product to be more robust than often necessary for its intended use

References

 "Unique electric bicycle launched" -  The News International
E-Rockit' hits German fast lane - BBC News

External links

Electric bicycles